Nothing Like a Dame (released in the United States as Tea With the Dames) is a 2018 British documentary film directed by Roger Michell, with Sally Angel serving as executive producer. It was produced by Sally Angel and Karen Steyn. The film documents conversations between actresses Eileen Atkins, Judi Dench, Joan Plowright and Maggie Smith (all of whom are Dames Commander of the Order of the British Empire) interspersed with scenes from their careers on film and stage.

Release
Nothing Like a Dame was released in the United Kingdom on 2 May 2018. The film was shown on television in the United Kingdom a few weeks after its initial theatrical release.

Reception
Nothing Like a Dame received critical acclaim. On the review aggregator website Rotten Tomatoes, the film has a 98% approval rating, based on 88 reviews, with an average rating of 7.9/10. The website's consensus reads, "Tea with the Dames proves there's plenty of entertainment value to be found in rounding up a quartet of screen legends for a chat -- and is likely to leave audiences wishing these stars would keep brewing up pots for an ongoing series." On Metacritic, it received a score of 85 out of 100, based on 19 reviews, indicating "universal acclaim".

Peter Bradshaw of The Guardian gave the film a five out of five star rating, declaring it an "outrageously funny film". Guy Lodge of Variety called the film a "richly enjoyable gabfest" but that the film was "hardly vital cinema".

Both Bradshaw and Lodge noted that they wish the film went through a wider range of topics such as Time's Up and the MeToo movements.

References

External links
 

2018 films
British documentary films
Documentary films about actors
Films directed by Roger Michell
IFC Films films
2010s English-language films
2010s British films